Elections to the Provincial Assembly of Balochistan were held in 1997. Balochistan National Party formed a coalition government with Jamhoori Wattan Party; Akhtar Mengal became the Chief Minister of the province.

Results

Further reading

References 

Elections in Balochistan
1997 elections in Pakistan